Pilot (Doctor Who) may refer to:

 The Pilot episode (Doctor Who), the first episode of the British science-fiction television series
 "The Pilot" (Doctor Who), the first episode of the tenth series of Doctor Who